The Östergötland archipelago is the collective name of three archipelagoes  located to the east of the shore of Östergötland, Sweden, spanning three municipalities. It consists of 8,888 islands. The archipelago's northern end adjoins the bay of Bråviken and is centered on Arkösund, off the Vikbolandet peninsula and forms part of Norrköping Municipality. The central part is called Sankt Anna's archipelago and is part of Söderköping Municipality. The southernmost part is the Gryt archipelago in Valdemarsvik Municipality, and adjoins the Tjust archipelago in Småland.

Communications
The three municipalities run the tour boat operation "Skärgårdslinjen" in the summer months, with regular scheduled boat travels along the coast. The county's Östgötatrafiken is responsible for the landbound mass transit in the area.

References

External links
  Östgötaskärgården 

Archipelagoes of the Baltic Sea
Östergötland
Landforms of Östergötland County
Archipelagoes of Sweden